2010 WCC may refer to:
World Chess Championship 2010
2010 World Club Challenge